The Pantheon of the Duchess of Sevillano ( or ) is an instance of funerary architecture built in eclectic style in Guadalajara, Spain.

Description 
After being granted authorisation in June 1887,  (1852–1916), Countess of Vega del Pozo, commissioned the project for the construction of a mausoleum for herself to Ricardo Velázquez Bosco. The Countess was locally known in Guadalajara rather as duquesa de Sevillano ("Duchess of Sevillano"), after another of her nobiliary titles. She inherited a large fortune, and devoted an important part of it to cultural patronage.

The building has a floor plan shaped like a greek cross, and it is built in stone from Novelda. The iconic dome is covered with purple tiles. The design of the vault inspired a number of works by Velázquez Bosco's disciple Antonio Palacios.

The buildings works ended in 1916, the year in which the Countess died.

References 

Bibliography 
 
 
 
 

Mausoleums in Spain
Buildings and structures in Guadalajara, Spain